Head Start is an Australian television drama series that ran for forty episodes on the Australian Broadcasting Corporation in 2001.

Story
A large banking corporation runs an ongoing competition to foster innovation, creativity and achievement for young Australians. Applicants aged 18 to 21 submit projects in the arts, sports, science, business and community fields. Each winner receives a $20,000 grant to make the dream project a reality.

They also get full board in a freshly renovated inner city warehouse with six other high achievers to keep them company. Living together in this hothouse environment opens the doors to hysteria, tears, innovative brainstorms and the odd flirtation with success. The successful seven are advised and directed by Garrett Quinn, a 40-year-old former corporate high flyer who lost everything in the crash of '87. He now sees this job as a way of redeeming himself.

Among this year's successful applicants are Loc Minh Vu, a Vietnamese internet programmer determined to set up a website to help refugees, Clare and Patrick Gormley, a brother and sister combination from the country who are attempting to establish and market their own line of yabbies for the fresh food market. Basia Lem is a documentary maker striving to complete a film on the life of one of the country's pioneer female aviators. Seth Wallace and Kyle Richter, designer and promoter of a new automatic gear change prototype for bicycles, and Katherine Ingram, a classical piano prodigy who is putting together a recording of her own compositions.

Cast
 David Hoflin as Patrick Gormley
 Nadia Townsend as Clare Gormley (episodes 1–18)
 Megan Dorman as Katherine Ingram
 Garth Holcombe as Seth Wallace
 Gareth Yuen as Loc Minh Vu (episodes 1–22)
 Freya Stafford as Basia Lem
 Ryan Johnson as Kyle Richter
 Blair Venn as Garrett Quinn
 Mereoni Vuki as Jade Matu (episodes 23–40)
 Charlie Clausen as Aaron Symonds (episodes 31–40)

See also
 List of Australian television series

External links
 ABC website dead link
 Australian Television Information Archive

Australian drama television series
Australian Broadcasting Corporation original programming
2001 Australian television series debuts
2001 Australian television series endings